Mythicomyiidae, commonly called mythicomyiids, are very tiny flies (0.5–5.0 mm) found throughout most parts of the world, especially desert and semi-desert regions, except the highest altitudes and latitudes. They are not as common in the tropics, but genera such as Cephalodromia and Platypygus are known from these regions. Many of these "microbombyliids" have a humpbacked thorax (as in the Acroceridae) and lack the dense vestiture common in the Bombyliidae. Mythicomyiids have until recently not had much attention in the literature. Their small size has caused them to be missed when collecting. Yellow pan trapping and fine-mesh netting in Malaise and aerial sweep nets has resulted in a number of undescribed species from many parts of the world. A high diversity of both genera and species exists for this family in Africa, especially northern and southern portions. About 350 species are known (most in the genus Mythicomyia Coquillett). Hundreds more await description.

Because of their extremely small size and curious body shapes, some genera have been at times placed in the Acroceridae or Empididae. Originally, taxa were placed in the subfamily Mythicomyiinae in the Empididae. Later, they were transferred to the Bombyliidae, where mythicomyiids have long been treated. Zaitzev (1991) was the first to give characters warranting raising the group to family level. Subsequent workers have followed Zaitzev's lead and treat the group as a separate family. The family is separated from the Bombyliidae by the unbranched wing vein R4+5 (branched in Bombyliidae), the extremely reduced or absent maxillary palpi (present in Bombyliidae), wings held together over the abdomen at rest (held at an angle in Bombyliidae), and the abdominal spiracles being placed in the terga (placed in the pleural membrane in Bombyliidae). Augmenting the morphological characters, it is also a much older lineage than any known Bombyliidae, dating from as far back as the Middle Jurassic (Palaeoplatypygus Kovalev; Callovian: 163–168 mya) with other genera known from the Cretaceous (Procyrtosia Hennig and Proplatypygus Zaitzev).

Genera and Subgenera

Acridophagus Evenhuis, 1983
Ahessea Greathead & Evenhuis, 2001
Amydrostylus Lamas, Falaschi & Evenhuis, 2015
†Borissovia Evenhuis, 2003
†Carmenelectra Evenhuis, 2003
Cephalodromia Becker, 1914
Cyrtisiopsis Séguy, 1930
Cyrtosia Perris, 1839
Doliopteryx Hesse, 1938
Elachymyia Hall & Evenhuis, 1987
Empidideicus Becker, 1907
Anomaloptilus Hesse, 19385
Cyrtoides Engel, 1933
†Eoacridophagus Myskowiak, Garrouste & Nel, 2016
†Eurodoliopteryx Nel, 2006
Glabellula Bezzi, 1902
Glella Greathead & Evenhuis, 2001
Hesychastes Evenhuis, 2002
Heterhybos Brèthes, 1919
Leylaiya Efflatoun, 1945
†Microburmyia Grimaldi & Cumming, 2011
Mitinha Rafael & Limeira-de-Oliveira, 2014
Mnemomyia Bowden, 1975
Mythenteles Hall & Evenhuis, 1986
Mythicomyia Coquillett, 1893
Nexus Hall & Evenhuis, 1987
Onchopelma Hesse, 1938
†Palaeoplatypygus Kovalev, 1985
Paraconsors Hall & Evenhuis, 1987
Pieza Evenhuis, 2002
Platypygus Loew, 1844
†Procyrtosia Zaitzev, 1986
†Proplatypygus Hennig, 1969
Pseudoglabellula Hesse, 1967
Psiloderoides Hesse, 1967
Reissa Evenhuis & Baéz, 2001
†Riga Evenhuis, 2013
Tamanduamyia Rafael & Limeira-de-Oliveira, 2014
Zzyzzarro Evenhuis, 2022

References 
Evenhuis, N.L., 2002. Catalog of the Mythicomyiidae of the world.Bishop Museum Bulletin in Entomology 10: 1-85. established classification of the family.
Greathead, D.J. & N.L. Evenhuis, 1997. Family Bombyliidae. In: Contributions to a Manual of Palaearctic Diptera Volume 2 (L. Papp & B. Darvas, eds.): 487-512. Science Herald, Budapest. provide a key to the Palaearctic genera.
Greathead, D.J. & N.L. Evenhuis, 2001.  Annotated keys to the genera of African Bombylioidea (Diptera: Bombyliidae; Mythicomyiidae). African Invertebrates 42: 105-224. good illustrated keys to African genera.
Zaitzev, V.F. 1991. the phylogeny and system of dipterous insects of the superfamily Bombylioidea (Diptera). Entomologicheskoe Obozreniye 70: 716-736. [English translation, 1992, in Entomological Review 71(4): 94-114.]

External links

Diptera.info Images
world catalog of Mythicomyiidae (original and updated catalog as pdf)
catalog of the Australian species of Mythicomyiidae
catalog of the fossil species of Mythicomyiidae
photo of Platypygus ridibundus

Brachycera families
 
Taxa named by Axel Leonard Melander